Koothanur is a town situated in the Tiruvarur district of Tamil Nadu, India (10.9315° N, 79.6474° E). The town is located at a distance of 25 kilometres from Tiruvarur. A temple for Saraswati, the Hindu goddess of learning is situated in this place. Koothanur is the only temple in Tamil Nadu for the goddess Saraswati. Saraswati is considered as the goddess of knowledge so people believe that if they worship this deity they will become good in knowledge.

History of Koothanur 

Koothanur is  the birthplace of the Tamil poet Ottakoothar. There is another reason for the name of this place which is Rajaraja Chola II gifted this village for koothan's poem because he is a great poet. So this village is called Koothan + oor = Koothanur. In India, Koothanur became an important tourist spot. Vijayadasami festival is celebrated in Koothanur which is one of the most important festivals in this temple.

References

See also  
 Koothanur Maha Saraswathi Temple 

Villages in Tiruvarur district